Mona Hanna-Attisha is a pediatrician, professor, and public health advocate whose research exposed the Flint water crisis. She is the author of the 2018 book What the Eyes Don't See, which The New York Times named as one of the 100 most notable books of the year.

Early life

Childhood and family
Born Mona Hanna in Sheffield, England, her parents are Iraqi scientists and dissidents who fled during the Baath regime.

Education
She grew up in Royal Oak, Michigan and graduated from Royal Oak's Kimball High School. Mona Hanna received her Bachelor of Science from University of Michigan School for Environment and Sustainability, her Master of Public Health degree in Health Management and Policy from the University of Michigan School of Public Health, and her medical degree from Michigan State University College of Human Medicine.

Residency
She completed her residency and chief residency at Wayne State University/Children's Hospital of Michigan.

Career
In 2009, Hanna-Attisha served as the associate pediatric program director at Children's Hospital of Michigan where she supervised over 100 residents, the development of academic curriculums, online education platform implementation, recruitment of residents, and participated in program committees.

Hanna-Attisha was appointed director of Hurley Medical Center’s pediatric residency program in 2011; there, she continued to supervise residents, develop instruction for students and a ‘master clinical teacher series’ for faculty. In 2012, Hanna-Attisha was elected to the Michigan Board of Directors for the American Academy of Pediatrics (AAP).

In 2013, Hanna-Attisha was named a member of the Public Health Code Advisory Committee who was called upon by then Michigan Governor Rick Snyder to complete a comprehensive review of the then 35-year-old Michigan Public Health Code.

Hanna-Attisha spoke at MSU Rx in 2014, an event modeled after TEDx, where she shared a presentation titled “What do you want to be when you grow up?” which focused on questions and challenges common to healthcare professionals and teachers working in urban settings like Flint, MI.

In 2015, Hanna-Attisha led an effort to focus on “prevention and nutrition, along with care for children when they are sick” by moving the Hurley Children’s Clinic to be co-located atop the Flint Farmers’ Market where health professionals could “suggest fresh foods to purchase and guide [patients] through the process.” In the spring, she received Michigan State University’s William B. Weil, Jr., MD Endowed Distinguished Pediatric Faculty Award after being nominated by her peers in recognition “for many years showing outstanding professional and clinical service to the children of our State, to our medical students and Residents, to our Department, the College and the University.” In late 2015, Hanna-Attisha’s high school classmate and friend Elin Ann Warn Betanzo, an engineer and certified water operator, shared that there was a lack of proper drinking water treatment in Flint, Michigan and an increased potential for lead in the city’s water after a recent water source change and that action was not being taken by officials. Hanna-Attisha learned that Marc Edwards, a civil engineering/environmental engineer from Virginia Tech University, had come to Flint in March 2015 and found that the lack of corrosion inhibitors in the new Flint water source was causing corrosion of water pipes and leaching of lead into drinking water. Upon hearing about the possibility of lead in the water, Hanna-Attisha began a new research study using data available in electronic medical records. Her study found that the percentage of children in Flint with over 5 micrograms per deciliter of lead in their blood increased from 2.1 percent to 4 percent after the city's water source changed from Lake Huron to the Flint River and that the areas of Flint with the highest water lead levels showed “the most drastic increases in elevated lead levels in children.”

Because of the public health implications, she revealed her findings publicly and advocated for action at a 24 September 2015 press conference before her research was scientifically peer reviewed. The next day, Flint issued a health advisory for residents, particularly children, to minimize exposure to Flint tap water. Hanna-Attisha's research and findings were criticized by the spokesperson for the State of Michigan’s Department of Environmental Quality who accused her of being an "unfortunate researcher," "splicing and dicing numbers," and causing "near hysteria." About ten days later, after the Detroit Free Press published its own findings consistent with those found by Hanna-Attisha, she then engaged in one-on-one conversations with Michigan's chief medical officer–the State of Michigan backed down and concurred with her findings. Later, at a press conference in which the State of Michigan acknowledged the lead-in-water crisis, Department of Environmental Quality officials apologized to Hanna-Attisha. In addition, Hanna-Attisha was appointed by Michigan Governor Rick Snyder's executive order to the Flint Water Interagency Coordinating Committee and Michigan Child Lead Poisoning Elimination Board in response to the Flint water crisis and the Michigan Public Health Commission.

On 14 January 2016, Michigan State University and the Hurley Children’s Hospital announced that Hanna-Attisha would lead a new Pediatric Public Health Initiative to partner with experts and clinicians to help the children of Flint who had been exposed to lead–the program serves as a center for excellence and a national resources for best practices related to lead exposure. In Governor Snyder’s 19 January 2016 State of the State address, he publicly thanked Hanna-Attisha and Edwards for sounding the alarm about the Flint water crisis. In late January, the Community Foundation of Greater Flint announced that Hanna-Attisha and a group of community members had established the Flint Child Health and Development Fund to accept charitable contributions nationwide “to support both short and long term needs of Flint’s children exposed to lead.” In one year, the fund raised over $17 million and awarded over $2 million in grants directly supporting Flint kids' health and development. Hanna-Attisha's findings were published in the February 2016 volume of American Journal of Public Health. She testified again in April 2016 before the U.S. House of Representatives Subcommittee on Environment and the Economy and Subcommittee on Health regarding the need for federal action to help increase access to care and provide relief to the people impacted by the man-made disaster resulting from the Flint water crisis. In July 2016, her research findings were confirmed in a Morbidity and Mortality Weekly Report published by the Center for Disease Control and Prevention (CDC) and is recognized as an underestimate of exposure. Eventually, in part due to Hanna-Attisha's advocacy, $100 million in federal dollars was allocated to Flint in addition to approximately $250 million in state dollars to address the crisis.

In January 2017, Hanna-Attisha received a grant from the Michigan Department of Health and Human Services to lay the groundwork for the Flint Registry. She has served as the principal investigator of the registry, which has grown into a congressionally-funded and CDC-supported public health program that helps provide long-term surveillance of and support to Flint water crisis victims. In March 2017, Hanna-Attisha was named vice-chair of Michigan Governor Rick Snyder’s Child Lead Exposure Elimination Commission.

In 2018, Hanna-Attisha’s book What the Eyes Don't See, was published by Random House imprint One World by editor-in-chief Chris Jackson. Her book has been described as a dramatic first-hand account of the Flint Water Crisis with the "gripping intrigue of a Grisham thriller." In addition to positive reviews in the New York Times, the New York Times Book Review, and the Washington Post, What the Eyes Don't See was named a New York Times 100 Notable Book of 2018 and the Best Science Book of 2018 by NPR's Science Friday. Portions of the proceeds of her book are donated to the Flint Child Health and Development Fund. Anonymous Content optioned the book rights to make a movie, to be produced by Michael Sugar and Rosalie Swedlin, and written/directed by Cherien Dabis.

In 2019, Hanna-Attisha’s book was named a Michigan Notable Book of 2019. What the Eyes Don't See was also selected as the common read for the Great Michigan Read, Reading Across Rhode Island, and One Maryland One Book as well as dozens of university common read programs.

In February 2020, Hanna-Attisha testified before the U.S. House of Representatives Committee on Energy and Commerce Subcommittee on Environment and Climate Change that proposed revisions to the EPA’s Lead and Copper Rule were “minimalistic and insufficient” and that “the proposed revisions do not fix these underlying issues, and will not address the national public health crisis of lead in our drinking water delivery system swiftly enough.”  In July 2020, Hanna-Attisha was named a C.S. Mott Endowed Professor of Public Health at the Michigan State University College of Human Medicine. She was also appointed to co-chair Michigan Governor Gretchen Whitmer’s Protect Michigan Commission.

In April 2021, Hanna-Attisha testified before the U.S. House of Representatives’ Committee on Ways and Means to advocate for action related to the state of the nation’s drinking water infrastructure and the need to eliminate lead pipes.

In February 2022, Hanna-Attisha testified before the U.S. House of Representatives Committee on Ways and Means Subcommittee on Select Revenue Measures that the “state of our drinking water infrastructure is a public health crisis” for the nation and the importance of the Infrastructure Investment and Job Act to the elimination of lead pipes.

Hanna-Attisha serves on several advisories/boards including Physicians for Human Rights Advisory Council, Arab Community Center for Economic and Social Services (ACCESS) Board Member, JPB Foundation Poverty and Environment Steering Committee Member, Abraham Lincoln Brigades Archives Board Member, and University of Michigan School of Public Health Griffith Leadership Center in Health Policy and Management Advisory Board Member.

Awards and honors

2016
 Time Magazine's 100 Most Influential People of 2016
 Politico 50 visionaries transforming American politics in 2016
 Ridenhour Prize for Truth-Telling
 PEN American Center James C. Goodale Freedom of Expression Courage Award
 One of the Ten Outstanding Young Americans of 2016.
Michiganian of the Year by the Detroit News.
 Rose Nader Award for Arab American activism by the American-Arab Anti-Discrimination Committee (ADC) 
 Champion of Justice by Arab Community Center for Economic and Social Services. 
 2016 commencement speaker at Michigan State University, Johns Hopkins School of Public Health, Virginia Tech as well as two other universities.

2017
 Commencement speaker at the University of Michigan School for Environment and Sustainability.
 Recognized by environmental organizations, including the Michigan League of Conservation Voters, the Michigan Environmental Council, the Ecology Center and Children's Environmental Health Network.  She was also named a Union of Concerned Scientists 2016 Got Science? Champion.
 Honorary co-chair of the March for Science
 Disobedience Award by the MIT Media Lab for "defying conventions of peer review as they sought to bring attention to Flint's water crisis before more people were affected." Hanna-Attisha and Edwards donated the $250,000 award to victims of the crisis.
 22nd Heinz Award for Public Policy

2018
 Inducted to the Michigan Women's Hall of Fame by the Michigan Women's Historical Center.
 Honorary Co-Chair of Governor Gretchen Whitmer's Transition Team.

2019
 Vilcek-Gold Award for Humanism in Healthcare in 2019. The award is a joint award presented in partnership between The Vilcek Foundation and the Arnold P. Gold Foundation. The award is bestowed to a foreign-born individual in the United States who has demonstrated an extraordinary impact on humanism in healthcare through their professional achievements.

2020
 Najeeb Halaby Award for Public Service, Arab American Institute Foundation
 Changemakers for Children’s Health Award, Children's Miracle Network Hospitals
 41st Telly Award, Political/Commentary, Story in the Public Square, The Telly Awards
 Fries Prize for Improving Health, Centers for Disease Control and Prevention (CDC) Foundation
 Scroll for Merit Award, National Medical Association
 100 Women of the Century, USA Today

2021
 32 of the Region’s Most Influential People of Color, Madison365 Midwest Power Brokers
 Detroit Duchess Award, Detroit Duchess Society
 Environmental Hero Award, Healthcare Without Harm
 James Shea Award, National Association of Geoscience Teachers
 100 Most Influential Women, Crain’s Detroit Business

2022
 Excellence in Instruction Award, Michigan State University & Hurley Children’s Hospital Pediatric Public Health Initiative
 John P. McGovern Award, Medical Library Association
 Inaugural Bernard Lown Award for Social Responsibility, Lown Institute
 Inaugural Social Justice Medicine in Action Award - The Blue Flame, Columbia University Postbac Premed Student Council, Social Justice Medicine Club

Personal life
Her husband, Elliott Attisha, is a pediatrician. They have two daughters.

Publications

Peer-reviewed academic works

References

External links
 
 Hanna-Attisha public Facebook page
 Hanna-Attisha on Twitter
 

American pediatricians
Women pediatricians
American public health doctors
People from Flint, Michigan
American whistleblowers
American people of Iraqi descent
University of Michigan School of Public Health alumni
Michigan State University College of Human Medicine alumni
Michigan State University faculty
Living people
People from Royal Oak, Michigan
University of Michigan School of Natural Resources and Environment alumni
1976 births
Chaldean Americans
Women public health doctors